Gruemirë is a former municipality in the Shkodër County, northwestern Albania. At the 2015 local government reform it became a subdivision of the municipality Malësi e Madhe. The population at the 2011 census was 8,890.

Name 
It is named after the settlement of Gruemirë which in turn takes its name from the legend of "Good women" which traditionally is translated good-mirë: women-grua (grue from dialect) and had its home territory in Gruemira. Gruemira is first mentioned in the cadaster of Venetian Shkodra in 1416. Traditionally, in Albanological research it has been seen as compound of grua (woman) and mirë (good).  Another theory based in the rendering of the toponym in the defter of Scutari in 1485 as Kuruemira proposes an etymology as a compound of krua (well) + mirë (good). The people of the fis and the village of Gruemirë are called Gruemiras.

Legend 
The legend of "Good women"—Once upon a time on a small cottage was only one well far away from there. A women went to the well to fill water. She had a long and tired road to do. Near her house it was a man (Trim-brave) passing there that was thirsty and asked the women for water. She didn't hesitate to complete his request, even she had to go back and take water again. From that time the settlement is called "The Good Women- Gruemirë", referring to all women on that cottage.

Settlements 
Gruemira is the biggest administrative unit on Albania, containing 15 settlements.
There are 15 settlements within Gruemirë. 
 Boriç i Madh
 Boriç i Vogël
 Demiraj
 Gjormë
 Grilë
 Grudë
 Gruemirë
 Ktosh
 Kurtë
 Linaj
 Omaraj
 Mëshqerrë
 Rrash-Kullaj
 Vajush
 Vorfë

References

Bibliography 

 
Administrative units of Malësi e Madhe
Former municipalities in Shkodër County